Gazanak is a city in Larijan District, Amol County, Mazandaran Province, Iran. In the 2006 census, its population was 323, with 94 families.

References

Populated places in Amol County
Cities in Mazandaran Province